Sir Anthony Forrest ( 1590s–1620s) was an English politician who sat in the House of Commons from 1624 to 1626.

Forrest was the son of Miles Forrest of Morborne, Huntingdonshire, and his wife Elizabeth Colly (dau. of Anthony Colly).  He was admitted  at Emmanuel College, Cambridge on 8 September 1591 and was admitted at Gray's Inn on 8 July 1595. He was knighted on 20 August 1604.  In 1624, he was elected Member of Parliament for Wallingford in the Happy Parliament. He was elected MP for Wallingford in 1625 and 1626.

Forrest married firstly Jane Haselrigge, daughter of Thomas Haselrigge of Noseley, Leicestershire at Noseley. His second wife was called Judith, and his third wife Robena.

References

Alumni of Emmanuel College, Cambridge
Members of Gray's Inn
People from Huntingdonshire
Year of birth missing
Year of death missing
English MPs 1624–1625
English MPs 1625
English MPs 1626